The Ghana Football Association (GFA) is a governing body of association football based in Accra. Founded in 1957, The association was dissolved by the Ghanaian Minister of Sport, Isaac Kwame Asiamah, on 7 June 2018, after the uncovering of corruption by investigative video footages. In October 2019, a new president, Kurt Okraku, was elected and the association reconvened upon the completion of the work of the FIFA Normalization Committee. Mark Addo was elected vice president in November 2019.

History

Gold Coast Football Association
The Ghana Football Association (GFA) is the successor to the Gold Coast Football Association, which used to be the governing body for football in Ghana and was one of the oldest football associations in Africa, having been founded in 1920. Records indicate that Cape Coast and Accra were the first colonial cities in sub-Saharan Africa to host formal leagues in the Gold Coast. After a weak start in 1915, the league kicked off in 1922 with the Accra Hearts of Oak Sporting Club emerging as winners, taking the coveted Guggisberg shield – named after the progressive British governor of that period and the man who started the Accra Football League, Sir Gordon Guggisberg.

Amateur status
Football was brought to the Gold Coast near the end of the 19th century by merchants from Europe, who had by then conquered the coastal areas and built forts and castles to facilitate trade. In their leisure time, the sailors would play football among themselves and with the indigenous people.

The popularity of the game spread quickly along the coast, culminating in the formation of the first football club, Excelsior, in 1903 by Mr. Briton, a Jamaican-born British citizen who was the then Head Teacher of Philip Quaque Government Boys School in Cape Coast. As the popularity of the game grew, other amateur clubs were formed along the coast, including: Accra Hearts of Oak, Accra Standfast, Cape Coast Venomous Vipers, Cape Coast Mysterious Dwarfs, Sekondi Hasaacas, and Sekondi Eleven Wise.

The Gold Coast Amateur Football Association
In 1952, the Government of the Gold Coast enacted Ordinance 14, which established the Gold Coast Amateur Sports Council, and granted the Government of the Gold Coast the legal authority to control all amateur Associations, including Football.

As the popularity of the game spread throughout the country, the existing clubs met towards the end of 1930 and elected Richard Maabuo Akwei as their chairman.

Towards the middle of 1950, the clubs, spearheaded by Ohene Djan, accused Akwei of maladministration and questioned his ability to help grow Ghanaian Football. They therefore addressed petitions to the Governor of the Gold Coast, Sir Charles Arden-Clarke, and the Pioneer Sports Organizer, Joseph Ranadurai, on the maladministration of the Amateur Football Association by Akwei. While the petition was being addressed, Ohene Djan led a "Football Revolution" and succeeded in toppling the Akwei Administration in 1957.

The Football Revolution – 1957

In 1957, Ohene Djan was elected General Secretary of the Football Association by the clubs and the Ghana Amateur Football Association was officially founded. He strategically affiliated the Association with FIFA in 1958 and the CAF in 1960.

Djan was instrumental in securing sponsorship for the first Ghanaian FA cup competition from a pharmaceutical firm, Merrs R.R. Harding and Company. In the same year he succeeded in securing the services of an expatriate Coach, George Ainsley, for the National Team. Then in 1959, he succeeded again in organizing the first national league, before Ghana became a republic on 1 July 1960.

The Winneba Declaration
Through the 1993 Winneba Declaration, Ghanaian football was able to shrug off its amateur status. The formation of professional teams allowed clubs to be incorporated under the companies code (Act 179, 1963) as Limited liability companies.

Dissolution
The Association was dissolved 'with immediate effect' on 7 June 2018, after undercover journalist Anas Aremeyaw Anas revealed the amount of corruption in the association and Ghanaian football in general. Referees and officials of the association were filmed taking bribes. The Sports Minister Isaac Kwame Asiamah referred to Kwesi Nyantakyi on Accra-based JoyFM as "former president" because all arms and affiliates of the GFA stood dissolved. Due to that the 2018 Ghanaian Premier League was cancelled. The GFA is set to reopen in August 2019.

Reconstitution and operations afterward 
Elections were held in October 2019 and out of the six candidates who contested, Kurt Okraku emerged the winner. In November 2019, the Women's League Committee was put together. The team was made up of Hilary Boateng (Chairperson), Rosalind Amoh (Vice chairperson), Nana Aba Anamoah, Cleopatra Nsia, Jerry Dogbatse, Nana Poku Fosu Geabour II and Christian Isaac Mensah. In January 2020, Prosper Harrison Addo was appointed the General Secretary.  
 
It was announced in early January 2020 that the technical crew of all the national teams had been disbanded. This was done with the intention of giving the sport a fresh start and enhancing the performance of the teams. Pursuant to the disbanding, Mercy Efua Tagoe-Quarcoo and Charles Kwabla Akonnor were appointed head coaches of the Black Queens and Black Stars respectively. Mercy Tagoe-Quarcoo was assisted by Charles Anokye Frimpong and Charles Akonnor by David Duncan. The National Teams Department was added to the outfit of GFA and Mr Alex Asante who is a Deputy General Secretary was appointed as its acting head.   

In September 2020, the Court of Arbitration for Sport dismissed an appeal by Wilfred Kwaku Osei Palmer which, amongst others, sought to nullify the Ghana Football Association presidential elections conducted in October 2019.

Partnerships 
In October 2020 the GFA signed an agreement with Decathlon Ghana, making the latter the official retail partner for Black Stars kits and equipment as well as other merchandising products.

In September 2022, Access Bank Ghana became official banking partner of the GFA in a USD250,000 one-year deal.

The Africa Cup of Nations
The Ghana Amateur Football Association was affiliated with CAF in 1960, and in 1963 won the bid to host the 5th Africa Cup of Nations, to coincide with the Meeting of the (OAU) Heads of States and Government in Accra. Ghana won the trophy and went ahead again to successfully defend it in Tunisia in 1965.

After the 1965 triumph, Ghana hosted and won the 13th Africa Cup of Nations in 1978, and four years later, won it again in Tripoli, Libya. The team have won the Africa Cup of Nations four times (in 1963, 1965, 1978, and 1982), making Ghana the second most successful team in the contest's history, along with Cameroon.

Although the team did not qualify for the senior FIFA World Cup until 2006, Ghana has enjoyed tremendous success at the youth level, winning the FIFA World Under-17 title twice and finishing runner-up twice. Ghana has also finished second at the FIFA World Youth Championship twice.

Ghana became the first African country to win a medal in Football at the 1992 Summer Olympics.

In 2009, Ghana became the first African country to win the U-20 FIFA World cup by defeating Brazil.

With regard to women's football, the Ghana Black Queens have participated in two World Cup tournaments and the Olympic Games. They have also been runners-up to the Falcons of Nigeria in the Africa Cup of Nations series.

Ghana last hosted the African Cup of Nations Tournament in January 2008.

Ghana qualified for the African Cup of Nations Tournament in January 2017 after finishing top of Group H in the qualifying stages.

Executive Chairmen/Presidents

Executive Council 
 Frederick Acheampong 
 Randy Abbey 
 Anim Addo

Match-fixing allegations
An undercover investigation led by The Telegraph and Channel 4 accused Kwesi Nyantakyi and other officials of the Ghana Federation of match-fixing. According to this information, the accusations involve just the international friendlies – thus, the World Cup matches wouldn't be affected by the suspicions. Kwesi Nyantakyi denied the match fixing allegations, saying: "the report of the newspaper or the media house is entirely not accurate." and "There is really no cause for alarm as far as I am concerned, because nothing untoward has happened involving me or the Federation".

References

External links
Official website
Ghana Premier League website
Ghanaweb Football/Soccer
Official website History page
CAN Qualifiers 2008 Africa Cup of Nations

1957 establishments in Ghana
2018 disestablishments in Ghana
Football in Ghana
Ghana
football
Sports organizations established in 1957
Sports organizations disestablished in 2018